Søren Krucov Rieks (born 7 April 1987) is a Danish professional footballer who plays as a winger for Malmö FF in Allsvenskan. He previously represented Esbjerg fB, NEC, and IFK Göteborg. A full international between 2009 and 2010, he has won three caps and scored one goal for the Denmark national team.

Club career

Esbjerg fB
From 2005 till 2012 Rieks played at hometown club Esbjerg fB.

NEC
In July 2012 he signed a three-year contract at Dutch side NEC.

IFK Göteborg
On 10 August 2014, Rieks joined Swedish side IFK Göteborg on a three and a half year contract. Having scored 21 goals in 92 appearances, Rieks left the club upon contract expiry at the end of the 2017 season.

Malmö FF
On 12 January 2018, Rieks signed for reigning Swedish champions Malmö FF on a three-year contract. This marked a rare direct move between IFK Göteborg and Malmö FF, the two historically most successful Swedish clubs.

International career
Rieks was called up for the Denmark national team in March 2009 for the two games against Albania and Malta.  This was his first call-up. He has been called up afterwards, and he had his international début against South Korea on 14 November 2009, and on 18 November 2009 he had his second international match, where he also scored his first international goal.

Career statistics

Club

International

Scores and results list Denmark's goal tally first, score column indicates score after each Rieks goal.

Honours
;Esbjerg fB
Danish 1st Division: 2011–12

IFK Göteborg
 Svenska Cupen: 2014–15

Malmö FF
 Allsvenskan: 2020, 2021
 Svenska Cupen: 2021–22
Individual
Esbjerg fB Player of the year: 2008–09, 2011–12

References

External links
Theplayersagent profile
Esbjerg fB profile
National team profile
Official Danish Superliga stats
Voetbal International profile 
 

1987 births
Living people
People from Esbjerg
Danish men's footballers
Denmark international footballers
Denmark under-21 international footballers
Danish expatriate men's footballers
Esbjerg fB players
NEC Nijmegen players
IFK Göteborg players
Malmö FF players
Danish Superliga players
Eredivisie players
Allsvenskan players
Expatriate footballers in the Netherlands
Expatriate footballers in Sweden
Association football midfielders
Sportspeople from the Region of Southern Denmark